Micek is a surname. Notable people with the surname include:

Alexa Micek (born 1991), Filipino American volleyball player
Ernest Micek (born 1936), American businessman